Ji Chunmei (born February 14, 1986) is a former professional Chinese tennis player.

Her highest WTA singles ranking is 352, which she reached on 10 May 2010. Her career-high in doubles is 61, which she reached on 12 May 2008.

WTA career finals

Doubles: 2 (1 title, 1 runner-up)

ITF Circuit finals

Singles: 2 (2 runner-ups)

Doubles: 18 (10 titles, 8 runner-ups)

See also
 Chinese tennis players
 Tennis in China

References

External links
 
 
 

1986 births
Living people
Chinese female tennis players
Tennis players from Jiangsu
21st-century Chinese women